Ruth Mildred Barker (February 3, 1897 – January 25, 1990) was a musician, scholar, manager, and spiritual leader from the Alfred and Sabbathday Lake Shaker villages. A prominent and respected Shaker during her long life, she worked to preserve Shaker music. With the help of Daniel Patterson, she recorded Early Shaker Spirituals, a collection of Shaker songs. In recognition of her achievements in the field, in 1983 she received the National Heritage Fellowship. She also co-founded and managed The Shaker Quarterly, a magazine and journal focused on the Shakers, to which she was also a regular contributor.

Biography

Birth and life at Alfred Village (1897–1931) 
Barker was born in Providence, Rhode Island on February 3, 1897. She joined the Shakers on July 7, 1903, when her newly widowed mother placed her under the care of the Alfred village. She was placed into the Second Family, where sister Harriet Coolbroth became a mother figure for Barker. Barker was tasked with assisting the very elderly sister Paulina Springer, whom she befriended. Springer taught Barker the song "Mother Has Come with Her Beautiful Song". Springer died in 1905, and on her deathbed asked Barker to always remain Shaker, which Barker promised she would do. Barker's inclination to music continued, as Coolbroth and Lucinda Taylor taught her and other girls in her care Shaker songs, and Barker attempted to learn as many of these songs as she could. She later claimed that it was the "vim and vigor" of Shaker song that attracted her to the faith. She belonged to a club called the "Beacon Light Circle". Barker's mother returned in 1911 to take her back home to Providence, but Barker insisted on remaining at Alfred to live as a Shaker. Seven years later, she signed the covenant, binding herself as a member of the Alfred community. That same year, the Second Family was closed, and thus Barker relocated to Alfred's Church Family.

Sabbathday Lake (1931–1990) 
In 1931, the Alfred community closed, and Barker moved to the Sabbathday Lake in New Gloucester, Maine. At Sabbathday Lake, she was placed in charge of the Girls' Order, where she formed the "Girls' Improvement Club", in which the girls and young women wrote poetry, practiced recitations, and studied the Bible. She also was placed in charge of preserves and candy making – specializing in hand-dipped chocolates – at the village's store, where she also sewed and knitted. She oversaw these industries until 1968. In 1950, she was made trustee of Sabbathday Lake and thus charged with running the businesses and finances for the entire village.

Since the 1940s, Barker was de facto spiritual leader for the Sabbathday Lake community. Gertrude Soule, who had left and rejoined the community several times, had been appointed Eldress in 1950, and felt uncomfortable with this level of Barker's influence. In 1957, she was appointed to the Parent Ministry at the Hancock Shaker Village, and so relocated to that Ministry's base in Pittsfield, Massachusetts. In 1971, Soules, now living at the Canterbury Shaker Village, decided not to return to Sabbathday Lake, and Barker was appointed Eldress in her stead.

In 1960, Theodore Johnson joined the Shakers, and the following year he and Barker launched The Shaker Quarterly, a journal and magazine that published scholarly articles on theology and the Shakers, shared news from the village, and, occasionally, advertised products produced by the community. Barker served as business manager for the publication from its founding until 1974, and frequently contributed articles as well as the regularly occurring newsletter column Home Notes. It was mostly through Barker's leadership that Sabbathday Lake decided to re-open their religious meetings to public attendance. She traveled as a speaker on topics regarding the Shakers. For many years, Barker worked with historian and musicologist Daniel W. Patterson toward preserving Shaker music. She commented that "I didn't realize for a very long time how important it was, it was a feeling that I got myself from the old songs, the music. It suddenly came upon me that I was keeping the tradition alive, which meant everything to me. We're just a small group, but it's something that the world needs and I'm sure it's going to pass right down through many centuries. I don't believe that it will be lost." She appeared on four recordings, including Early Shaker Spirituals. In recognition of her contributions to traditional Shaker song, in 1983 Barker was awarded a National Heritage Fellowship by the National Endowment for the Arts. Over the course of her life, she received numerous other awards as well. Barker died on January 25, 1990, after battling cancer for several months.

Awards 
 Catholic Art Association award, 1965
 Maine Arts Commission award, 1971
 National Heritage Fellowship, 1983
 Women's Career Center award from Westbrook College, 1987

Selected works

Citations

References

External links 
 PBS special with Mildred Barker discussing Shaker dance

1897 births
1990 deaths
American Christian religious leaders
20th-century American businesspeople
20th-century American businesswomen
20th-century American poets
20th-century American historians
20th-century American women writers
20th-century American singers
20th-century Christian mystics
Female religious leaders
Musicians from Providence, Rhode Island
People from Alfred, Maine
People from New Gloucester, Maine
Protestant mystics
Historians of Maine
American historians of religion
American women historians
Folk musicians from Maine
American folk singers
American gospel singers
American Christian mystics
National Heritage Fellowship winners
20th-century American women singers
Shaker members
Deaths from cancer in Maine
Historians from Rhode Island
Singers from Rhode Island
Singers from Maine
Historians from Maine